William Bradford Hall (born March 21, 1958) is an American actor, comedian and filmmaker. He is best known as a Weekend Update news anchor on Saturday Night Live and for creating the sitcoms The Single Guy and Watching Ellie. 

Hall was a producer, writer, and director on the Golden Globe winning sitcom Brooklyn Bridge, for which he received a Primetime Emmy Award nomination. He has appeared in various motion pictures, most notably the 1986 cult classic Troll and as Nancy Allen's boyfriend in 1990's Limit Up. In 2012, he directed Picture Paris, which appeared at the Tribeca Film Festival. He also has guest-starred on series such as Parks and Recreation, Brooklyn Nine-Nine, and Curb Your Enthusiasm.

Personal life 
Hall was born in Santa Barbara, California. He was an avid surfer as a child, saying that he "learned how to surf as soon as I could walk."

Hall is married to actress Julia Louis-Dreyfus, whom he met while both were attending Northwestern University in Evanston, Illinois. They met in a comedy troupe that Hall started, called The Practical Theater. They both performed on Saturday Night Live from 1982 to 1984, appeared together in Troll (1986), and guest-starred together on two episodes of Curb Your Enthusiasm. They have two sons, Henry (b. 1992) and Charles (b. 1997).

Filmography

Recurring characters on SNL 
Mike Phillips, friend of El Dorko (Gary Kroeger)
The Human Stapler, a superhero who uses his hands to bind his victims (a member of The Interesting Four)
Larry Rolans, the host of Larry's Corner

Celebrity impersonations 
John DeLorean
John Hinckley
Noel Paul Stookey
Pete Best
William F. Buckley
John Lennon

References

External links 

 

1958 births
Living people
Williston Northampton School alumni
American male bloggers
American bloggers
American male screenwriters
American male television actors
Television producers from California
Male actors from Santa Barbara, California
Northwestern University School of Communication alumni
20th-century American male actors
21st-century American male actors
Writers from Santa Barbara, California
American sketch comedians
Comedians from California
Louis-Dreyfus family
Screenwriters from California